Mahmud Gazag (also Romanized as Maḩmūd Gazag; also known as Maḩmūd Gazak) is a village in Amirabad Rural District, Muchesh District, Kamyaran County, Kurdistan Province, Iran. At the 2006 census, its population was 248, in 53 families. The village is populated by Kurds.

References 

Towns and villages in Kamyaran County
Kurdish settlements in Kurdistan Province